is a Japanese long-distance runner.

In 2017, she competed in the senior women's race at the 2017 IAAF World Cross Country Championships held in Kampala, Uganda. She finished in 80th place.

In 2018, she competed in the women's half marathon at the 2018 IAAF World Half Marathon Championships held in Valencia, Spain. She finished in 17th place.

References

External links 
 

Living people
1995 births
Place of birth missing (living people)
Japanese female cross country runners
Japanese female long-distance runners